Michael Masi (born 8 June 1978) is an Australian motorsports official. Masi served as Formula One race director from 2019 to 2021. In this role, Masi oversaw the logistics of a Formula One racing weekend, ensuring all cars, tracks, and drivers conform to FIA regulations before, during, and after a race. Masi was removed from his position following an FIA analysis into his application of safety car procedure at the 2021 Abu Dhabi Grand Prix.

Early life 
Masi was born in Sydney in 1978 and is of Italian descent. Growing up in the suburbs of Fairfield and Canada Bay, Masi initially studied marketing at TAFE before his roles in motorsport.

Career

Early career
Masi began his career in motor racing volunteering for Super Touring teams while still at school. He worked as deputy race director in the Supercars touring car racing series and at Rally Australia. In 2018, he was appointed by the FIA as the Formula 2 and Formula 3 deputy race director, and was appointed deputy to F1 race director Charlie Whiting.

Formula One
Following Whiting's death before the 2019 Australian Grand Prix, Masi took on the role of Formula One race director.

Several of Masi's decisions as race director were subject to scrutiny from drivers, teams, and press. During the 2020 Turkish Grand Prix qualifying session, cars were sent out on track even when a crane was on the track. During the 2021 season, Masi was required to defend the red flag procedures used during the 2021 Azerbaijan Grand Prix. In the 2021 Belgian Grand Prix, Masi was criticised for running qualifying in dangerous conditions, and then running the race behind the safety car for three laps, allegedly to ensure points were awarded. He was criticized for negotiating with teams to change positions during the 2021 Saudi Arabian Grand Prix. The following week, Masi's procedural error in the resumption of the race following a safety car period during the final lap of the 2021 Abu Dhabi Grand Prix was criticised for potentially altering championship results. Mercedes protested the result; the protest was not upheld.

On 17 February 2022, Masi was removed from his role as Race Director following an FIA analysis into the Abu Dhabi Grand Prix. He was replaced by Niels Wittich and Eduardo Freitas as race directors on an alternating basis for the 2022 Formula One season, and Herbie Blash as Permanent Senior Advisor to them. A new position within the FIA was offered to Masi.

On 19 March 2022, the FIA published their official report into the Abu Dhabi controversy, concluding that Masi had incorrectly applied regulations, in that not all lapped cars had unlapped themselves, and the safety car had not completed one additional lap before coming back into the pitlane. The report attributed these matters to human error.

Mercedes boss Toto Wolff subsequently referred to Masi as having been a "liability" to Formula One and stated that Masi did not take well to receiving feedback or criticism from anybody, as well as suggesting that he had acted disrespectfully at times towards some drivers in briefings.

Post Formula One 
In July 2022, Masi left the FIA in order to relocate to Australia and spend more time with his family. In September, Masi was appointed the independent Chairman of the Supercars Commission in Australia. He was appointed to the board of directors of Karting Australia in December.

References 

1979 births
Australian motorsport people
Australian people of Italian descent
Australian sports executives and administrators
Formula One people
Living people
Sportspeople from Sydney